Lemer may refer to:

 Peter Lemer (born 1942), English jazz musician
 Lemer Public School, a school in Kerala, India

English-language surnames